Pilosocereus royenii is a species of cactus found throughout the West Indies and the states of Yucatán and Quintana Roo in Mexico.  Common names include Royen's tree cactus, dildo cactus, and pipe organ cactus. It is composed of multiple long, tubular shaped branches, each ribbed with multiple sections and sharp spines.

Gallery

References 

 
 Dildo cactus
 St John Beach Guide
 Turks and Caicos Islands Department of Environment and Coastal Resources

royenii
Cacti of North America
Flora of the Caribbean
Flora of Mexico
Plants described in 1957